Sarah Prineas is an American fantasy author who lives in Iowa and once worked for the honors program at the University of Iowa. She is married to John Prineas, a Professor in the Department of Physics and Astronomy and the Optical Science and Technology Center at the University of Iowa. They have two children. Prineas is originally from Lyme, Connecticut. She went to college in Minnesota. She has lived in Germany.

Her first novel The Magic Thief was published in 2008 by HarperCollins in the United States.  As of June 2008, foreign rights had been sold to thirteen other countries.  The sequel, The Magic Thief: Lost came out in 2009 and a third book, The Magic Thief: Found came out in 2010. Before she turned to novels, Prineas wrote fantasy short stories for adult markets. She also created Thorn and Rose.

In 2008, she donated her archive to the department of Rare Books and Special Collections at Northern Illinois University.

Publications

Novels
 The Magic Thief. (2008) HarperCollins.
 The Magic Thief: Lost. (2009) HarperCollins.
 The Magic Thief: Found. (2010) HarperCollins.
 Winterling (2011) HarperCollins.
Summerkin (2012) Harper Collins
Moonkind (2013) Harper Collins
The Magic Thief: Home. (2014) HarperCollins.
Ash and Bramble (2015)
Rose and Thorn (Ash and Bramble #2) (2016)
Heart of the Land (Spirit Animals: Fall of the Beasts #5) (2017)
The Lost Books: The Scroll of Kings (2018) HarperCollins
Dragonfell (2019)
Trouble in the Stars (2021)

Short stories
 From the Journals of Professor Copernicus Finch, M.S. Hex.D. (2000) Ideomancer.
 Water, Green River, Daybreak (2001) 
 The Illuminated Dragon (2002)
 A Treatise on Fewmets 
 Crow's Changeling (2005) 
 Hekaba's Demon
 Winged Victory (2005) 
 Dragon Hunt (2007)
 The Red Cross Knight (2011)
 Thrice Sworn (Winterling #0.5) (2013)
 OWL: A Winterling Story about Fer and Rook (2015)
 Jane. A Story of Manners, Magic and Romance

References

External links

 
 Short stories published on Strange Horizons
 
  
 University of Iowa, Faculty & Staff News, June 16, 2008
 Publishers Weekly, June 23, 2008
 Northern Illinois University Science Fiction and Fantasy Writers of America (SFWA) Collection
 Publishers Weekly, 2/16/2009

American children's writers
American fantasy writers
American women children's writers
Writers from Iowa City, Iowa
Living people
Year of birth missing (living people)
Place of birth missing (living people) 
Women science fiction and fantasy writers
Novelists from Iowa
21st-century American women